The New Zealand Newspaper Publishers’ Association awards are annual New Zealand media awards recognising excellence in the news print media. The first awards were held in 1974 giving out awards for news photography and have expanded to include many disciplines of journalism. The awards were rebranded the Voyager Media Awards in 2018, and were previously branded the Canon Media Awards and the Qantas Media Awards.

Awards 
Incomplete list
1991 Qantas Media Awards
1992 Qantas Media Awards
1993 Qantas Media Awards
1994 Qantas Media Awards
1995 Qantas Media Awards
1996 Qantas Media Awards
1997 Qantas Media Awards
1998 Qantas Media Awards
1999 Qantas Media Awards
2000 Qantas Media Awards
2001 Qantas Media Awards
2002 Qantas Media Awards
2003 Qantas Media Awards
2004 Qantas Media Awards
2005 Qantas Media Awards
2006 Qantas Media Awards
2007 Qantas Media Awards
2008 Qantas Media Awards
2009 Qantas Media Awards
2010 Qantas Media Awards
2011 Canon Media Awards
2012 Canon Media Awards
2013 Canon Media Awards
2014 Canon Media Awards
2015 Canon Media Awards
2016 Canon Media Awards
2017 Canon Media Awards
2018 Voyager Media Awards
2019 Voyager Media Awards
2020 Voyager Media Awards

References

External links
 

Mass media in New Zealand
New Zealand awards
Awards established in 1974
Journalism awards